Riccardo Gagliolo (born 28 April 1990) is a professional footballer who plays as a left back for  club Reggina. Born in Italy to an Italian father and a Swedish mother, he won one cap for the Sweden national team in 2019.

Club career
Gagliolo made his senior debuts with Andora Calcio in the Eccellenza Liguria. In summer 2010, he joined Sanremese. In November 2011, he moved to Pro Imperia in Serie D.

In the summer of 2012, Gagliolo joined Carpi after a trial. On 3 July 2013, he signed a new deal with the club extending until 2017.

On 24 August 2013, Gagliolo made his Serie B debut, starting in a 1–0 loss at Ternana; he scored his first goal on 29 December, the only goal of the game in a home win over Juve Stabia.

On 24 July 2022, Gagliolo moved to Reggina on a multi-year contract.

International career 
Gagliolo's mother was Swedish. He has a Swedish passport and has expressed a wish to play for the Sweden national team, specifically with Zlatan Ibrahimović. On 2 October 2019, Gagliolo was called up to Sweden's UEFA Euro 2020 qualifying games against Malta and Spain. Gagliolo made his international debut starting and playing the full game for Sweden in a 3–0 win against the Faroe Islands in the last game of the Euro 2020 qualifying stage.

Personal life
Riccardo Gagliolo was born in Imperia, Italy to an Italian father and a Swedish mother from Sundsvall. Gagliolo understands the Swedish language well but has said that he struggles to speak it himself. His mother Eva eventually moved back to Sweden where she died after a long illness in spring 2020 as Gagliolo was stuck in Italy due to the COVID-19 pandemic. His maternal grandfather played football for Essviks AIF, near Sundsvall.

Career statistics

Club

International

References

External links

Living people
1990 births
People from Imperia
Footballers from Liguria
Association football defenders
Italian footballers
Swedish footballers
Sweden international footballers
Swedish people of Italian descent
Italian people of Swedish descent
Serie A players
Serie B players
Serie C players
S.S.D. Sanremese Calcio players
A.C. Carpi players
Parma Calcio 1913 players
U.S. Salernitana 1919 players
Reggina 1914 players
Sportspeople from the Province of Imperia